Giuseppe Forti (December 21, 1939 – July 2, 2007) was an Italian astronomer and a discoverer of asteroids.

Forti was a trained solar physicist, and worked at Harvard's Radio Meteor Project and later at the Arcetri Observatory, in Florence, Italy. He was a member of the third IAU Division: Planetary Systems Sciences. The Minor Planet Center credits him with the discovery of 49 numbered minor planets during 1977–2001.

He died at the age of 67 on July 2, 2007. The main-belt asteroid 6876 Beppeforti, discovered by his colleges Andrea Boattini and Maura Tombelli at the Asiago Astrophysical Observatory in 1994, was named in his honor. Naming citation was published on 3 May 1996.

List of discovered minor planets

References 
 

1939 births
2007 deaths
21st-century Italian astronomers
Discoverers of minor planets

20th-century Italian astronomers